The Electoral district of Roebourne was a Legislative Assembly electorate in the state of Western Australia. It was named for the town of Roebourne and was created in 1890, being one of the original 30 seats contested at the 1890 colonial election. In 1898, the boundaries of the district did not extend far beyond the settlements of Roebourne and Cossack.

The seat was abolished in the 1948 redistribution under the Electoral Districts Act 1947, and was absorbed into the seat of Pilbara. Its final member, Aloysius Rodoreda, transferred successfully to the Pilbara seat at the election.

Members for Roebourne

Election results

References

Roebourne